Ahmed Djemal (6 May 1872 – 21 July 1922), also known as Cemal Pasha, was an Ottoman military leader and one of the Three Pashas that ruled the Ottoman Empire during World War I.

Djemal was born in Mytilene, Lesbos. As an officer of II Corps he was stationed in Salonica where he developed political sympathies for the Committee of Union and Progress (CUP) reformers. He was initially praised by Christian missionaries and provided support to the Armenian victims of the Adana massacres. 

In the course of his army career Djemal developed a rivalry with Mustafa Kemal Atatürk, served in Salonica on the frontlines of the Balkan Wars and was given the military command of Constantinople after the Raid on the Sublime Porte. Djemal's authoritarian three year rule in Syria alienated the local population who opposed Turkish nationalism. Djemal Pasha's role in the Armenian genocide has been controversial as his policies were not as deadly as other CUP leaders; Djemal favored the forced assimilation of Armenians.

Biography
Of Turkish origin Ahmed Djemal was born in Mytilene, Lesbos, to Mehmet Nesip Bey, a military pharmacist. Destined for the army, Djemal graduated from Kuleli Military High School in 1890 and completed his studies at the Military Academy (Mektebi Harbiyeyi Şahane), the staff college in Istanbul, in 1893.He was posted to serve with the 1st Department of the Imperial General Staff (Seraskerlik Erkânı Harbiye), and then he worked at the Kirkkilise Fortification Construction Department bound to Second Army. Djemal was assigned to the II Army Corps in 1896; being appointed two years later, the staff commander of Novice Division, stationed on the Salonica frontier.

Meanwhile, he began to sympathize with the Committee of Union and Progress (CUP), and joined the organization in 1898. It was in 1905 that Djemal was promoted to major and designated Inspector of Rumelia Railways. The following year he signaled his democratic credentials and joined the Ottoman Liberty Society. He became influential in the department of military issues of the Committee of Union and Progress. He was elected to the Board of the III Army Corps in 1907. Following the Young Turk Revolution in 1908 he became a member of the central committee (Merkezi Umum-i) of the CUP and later was deployed as a Kaymakam to Üsküdar, Constantinople. 

Between August 1909 and April 1911 was assigned as governor of the Adana Vilayet. In Adana he was involved in providing support for the Armenian victims of the Adana massacres, and was praised by Christian missionaries in the region as a competent administrator. In the III Army Corps, he worked with future Turkish statesmen Major Fethi (Okyar) and Mustafa Kemal (Atatürk), although Atatürk soon developed a rivalry with Djemal Pasha and his colleagues over their policies after they seized power in 1913. Between 1908 and 1918, Djemal was one of the most important leaders of the Ottoman government.

Balkan Wars

In 1911, Djemal was appointed Governor of Baghdad. He then resigned to rejoin the army in the Balkan Wars on the Salonica front line, attempting to bolster Turkey's European possessions from encroachment. In October 1912, he was promoted to colonel. At the end of the First Balkan War, he played an important role in the propaganda drawn up by the CUP against negotiations with the victorious European countries. He tried to resolve the problems that occurred in Constantinople after the Bab-ı Ali Attack (Coup of 1913). Djemal played a significant role in the Second Balkan War, and with the revolution of the CUP on 23 January 1913, he became the commander of Constantinople and was appointed Minister of Public Works. He was assigned the military command in the Constantinople Vilayet by Grand Visier Mahmud Sevket Pasha and by December 1913 he was given the title Pasha.

World War I

When Europe was divided into two blocs before the First World War, he supported an alliance with France. He went to France to negotiate an alliance with the French, but failed and then sided with Enver and Talaat, who favoured the German side. Djemal, along with Enver and Talaat, took control of the Ottoman government in 1913. The Three Pashas effectively ruled the Ottoman Empire for the duration of World War I.

After the Ottoman Empire declared war on the Allies in World War I, Enver Pasha nominated Djemal Pasha to lead the Ottoman army against British forces in Egypt, and Djemal accepted the position. In late 1914, he was assigned with the Governorship and the military command for the southern provinces of the Ottoman Empire. Previously snubbed by the Allies, Djemal switched his attention to an alliance with the Central Powers, although he had at first been opposed to a full alliance with Germany. Nevertheless, he agreed in early October 1914 to use his ministerial powers to authorise Admiral Souchon to launch a pre-emptive strike in the Black Sea, which led to Russia, Britain and France declaring war on the Ottoman Empire a few days later.

Governing Syria 

Djemal Pasha was appointed with full powers in military and civilian affairs as Governor of Syria in 1915. A provisional law granted him emergency powers in May of that year. All cabinet decrees from Constantinople concerning Syria became subject to his approval. His offensives on both his first and second attacks on the Suez Canal failed. Coupled with the wartime exigencies and natural disasters that afflicted the region during these years, this alienated the population from the Ottoman government, and led to the Arab Revolt. In the meantime, the Ottoman army usually commanded by Colonel Kress von Kressenstein pushed towards and occupied Sinai. The two men had a thinly disguised contempt for each other, which weakened the command.

He was known among the local Arab inhabitants as al-Saffah, "the Blood Shedder", being responsible for the hanging of many Lebanese and Syrian Arab nationalists, including Sunni Muslims, Shia Muslims and Christians, wrongly accused of treason on 6 May 1916 in Damascus and Beirut. In total between 1915–1916, Djemal had 34 Syrian and Lebanese politicians and nationalists executed.

In his political memoirs, the leader of the "Beirut Reform Movement" Salim Ali Salam recalls the following: Jamal Pasha resumed his campaign of vengeance; he began to imprison most Arab personalities, charging them with treason against the State. His real intent was to cut off the thoughtful heads, so that, as he put it, the Arabs would never again emerge as a force, and no one would be left to claim for them their rights … After returning to Beirut [from Istanbul], I was summoned … to Damascus to greet Jamal Pasha … I took the train … and upon reaching Aley we found that the whole train was reserved for the prisoners there to take them to Damascus … When I saw them, I realized that they were taking them to Damascus to put them to death. So … I said to myself: how shall I be able to meet with this butcher on the day on which he will be slaughtering the notables of the country? And how will I be able to converse with him? … Upon arriving in Damascus, I tried hard to see him that same evening, before anything happened, but was not successful. The next morning all was over, and the … notables who had been brought over from Aley were strung up on the gallows.  At the end of 1915, Djemal with viceregal powers is said to have started secret negotiations with the Allies for ending the war; he proposed to take over the Ottoman administration himself as an independent King of Syria. These secret negotiations came to nothing, in part because the Allies reportedly could not agree on the future territory of the Ottoman Empire; France objected strongly, and Britain was unwilling to fund the Imperial operations.

His most successful military exploit was against the British Mesopotamian Expeditionary Force, which had arrived in early 1915 from India. 35,000 British troops marched north on Baghdad, hoping to take the citadel with relatively few casualties. Djemal Pasha was appointed to command and marshaled a vast army, ultimately led by Halil Kut Pasha, which by the time of the siege of Kut al-Amara numbered 200,000 Turks and Arab auxiliaries. The British could only evacuate their wounded with Djemal's consent and attempted to send emissaries requesting permission to evacuate while the city was encircled on three sides. Djemal refused to compromise his advantageous position, and strafed enemy attempts by the Tigris Corps to take relief boats up river. They had underestimated Djemal's considerable administrative capabilities and will to resist the Allied armies. The Ottoman troops fought hard at the Battle of Ctesiphon, but the subsequent fate of POWs and civilians later enhanced Djemal Pasha's wartime reputation as a capricious and cruel general. Nonetheless, the successes impressed T. E. Lawrence to write a significant account of their diplomatic encounters when finally Kut fell in April 1916, which provides for "a colourful character".

The ever-present threat of Arab Revolt fomented by British intelligence was rising throughout 1916 and 1917. Djemal instituted strict control over Syria Province against Syrian opponents. Djemal's forces also fought against the Arab nationalists and Syrian nationalists from 1916 onwards. Ottoman authorities occupied the French consulates in Beirut and Damascus and confiscated French secret documents that revealed evidence about the activities and names of the Arab insurgents. Djemal used the information from these documents as well as from others belonging to the Decentralization Party. He believed that insurgency under French control was the main reason for his military failings. With the documents he gathered, Djemal moved against the insurgent forces which were led by Arab political and cultural leaders. This was followed by the military trials of the insurgents known as Âliye Divan-ı Harb-i Örfisi in which they were punished.

Commander of Fourth Army 

Gaza's head of garrison, Major Tiller, had 7 infantry battalions, a cavalry squadron, and some camel troops. The British under Colonel Chetwode already had 2,000 troops in front of the city. Reluctantly, Djemal marched with the 33rd Division to relieve Gaza. Kressenstein was delighted to have repelled the British assault and wanted to mobilise aggressively by driving into Shellal, Wadi Ghazze, and Khan Yunis, but Djemal absolutely forbade it. The British had a whole division in retreat, so Djemal apprehended that a two-battalion sortie would have been annihilated. One of Djemal's associates in Iraq was engineer Colonel Heinrich August Meissner who had built both the Hejaz and Baghdad railways and who was employed on an ambitious project to construct a railway to the Suez canal at Bir Gifgafa. By October 1915, the Central Powers had already built 100 miles of track as far as the oasis of Beersheba. Djemal insisted that an extended railway would be needed to attack British Egypt.

Djemal was completely committed to the Turko-German military machine, which he saw as necessary to resist the new wave of offensives launched by the British High Command. Mustafa Kemal Pasha and Djemal Pasha became increasingly skeptical of German capabilities, but Djemal was not yet prepared to openly back the German allies. He insisted on the possibility of a planned allied assault behind the Yıldırım Army, as the Seventh Army gathered at the Turco-German Aleppo Conference. In the shake-up that followed, Djemal was demoted to a command of the Fourth Army under General Erich von Falkenhayn. They now adopted a plan similar to the Kress Plan for Gaza and sent the Yıldırım Army to Baghdad. It was not until October 1917 that the Seventh Army could march south to face the growing threat from Edmund Allenby, hampered by the limitations of the single-gauge railway, which was built away from the coastline to avoid Royal Navy salvos. During this time, Djemal presided over the 1917 Jaffa deportation in which he was accused of allowing the Jewish population of Jaffa to be robbed, assaulted, starved and killed.

On 7 November, the British captured Gaza, but Djemal had long since been forced to evacuate. Although chased, he managed to retreat at speed. In December, the Turks were driven out of Jaffa, Djemal's army still in retreat, and the city fell without a fight. Falkenhayn had ordered an evacuation on 14th, and the British had begun to enter the same day. But now the Turkish Eighth formed a much stronger line of entrenchment; Djemal's organized defence of Gaza had been amply anticipated by the British. His army delayed them further at the vital Junction railway station. But the British were probably unaware of its importance.

The fighting in the hills was all but over by 1 December. On 6 December, Djemal Pasha was in Beirut to make a speech publicizing the allied deal to 'carve up' Syria-Palestine into partitioned spheres of influence in the Sykes-Picot agreement. At the end of 1917, Djemal ruled from his post in Damascus as a near-independent ruler of his portion of the Empire. On 9 April and then 19 April 1918, Djemal ordered the evacuation of civilians from Jaffa and Jerusalem. The Germans were furious and rescinded the order, revealing the chaos in the Ottoman Empire. Djemal's ambiguous attitude to the subject populations of the Ottoman Empire proved beneficial to the British colonial authorities. The Turkish line was solidified in readiness for the final onslaught at Nebi Samwell and Nahr-el-Auja. To the south of Nebi were the defences of Beit Iksa; the Heart and Liver Redoubts before Lifa; and Deir Yassin, two systems behind Ain Karim. In all, there were 4 miles of fortifications. Djemal Pasha was recalled to Istanbul in June 1918.

Role in the Armenian genocide
Djemal's role in the Armenian genocide has been contested by historians. His policies allowed some Armenians to survive in the territories under his control. German historian Wolfgang Gust states, "while preserving the lives of perhaps 150,000 Armenians—in terrible conditions—he helped kill another 150,000". In December 1915, he offered to the Entente powers that he would march to Constantinople, overthrow the CUP government, and end the genocide in exchange for the guarantee of the Ottoman Empire's territorial integrity in its pre-World War I borders. Historian Ümit Kurt argues that "The most fundamental difference between Cemal and the other two leaders [Talat and Enver] was the methods he wanted to employ to decrease the number of Armenians to a level that would no longer pose a threat to the Ottoman state." Instead of killing Armenians, he favored their forced conversion and assimilation to neutralize the perceived Armenian threat. Kurt furthermore argues: "Saving the lives of some fortunate Armenians does not exempt Cemal from the label ‘génocidaire’, for he was fully committed to the disappearance of Armenians from Ottoman soil."
In the CUP's penultimate congress held in 1917, Djemal was elected to the Board of Central Administration.

Military trial and assassination

With the defeat of the empire in October 1918 and the resignation of Talaat Pasha’s cabinet on 2 November 1918, Djemal fled with seven other leaders of the CUP to Germany, and then Switzerland.

A military court in Turkey accused Djemal of massacring Arab subjects of the Ottoman Empire and sentenced him to death in absentia. Later in 1920, Djemal went to Central Asia, where he worked as a military advisor, charged with modernising the Afghan Royal Army.

Assassination
Due to the success of the Bolshevik Revolution, Djemal traveled to Tiflis to act as a military liaison officer to negotiate over Afghanistan with the Communist Party of the Soviet Union. Together with his secretary, Djemal was assassinated on 21 July 1922 by Armenian Revolutionary Federation members Stepan Dzaghigian, Artashes Gevorgyan, and Petros Ter Poghosyan, as part of Operation Nemesis, a global plan by Armenians to track down and assassinate all surviving perpetrators of the Armenian genocide. Djemal's remains were brought to Erzurum and buried there.

Family 
Djemal Pasha married Seniha Hanım in Salonica in 1899. His grandson Hasan Cemal is a well-known columnist, journalist and writer in Turkey.

Legacy
Djemal Pasha is known in the Lebanon and Syria as Jamal Basha as-Saffah ("the Blood-shedder"), for his treatment of the local Syrian population during WWI. Djemal Pasha named a street in Damascus after himself, but the name was later changed to "al-nasr street".

In Syria and Lebanon, 6 May is Martyrs' Day, a national holiday that commemorates the execution of seven Syrians in Damascus and 14 in Beirut by Djemal Pasha for their collaboration with the British and French at the height of WWI. The French and British had promised arms and Financing for some Syrians and Lebanese actors with the ultimate independence and statehood status, provided they revolt and sabotage the Ottoman war effort. The squares in the cities that they were executed in were renamed Martyrs' Square.

References

Bibliography

Further reading

External links

 
 
 
 Hasan Kayali: Cemal Pasa, Ahmed, in: 1914-1918-online. International Encyclopedia of the First World War.

1872 births
1922 deaths
People from Mytilene
Kuleli Military High School alumni
Ottoman Military Academy alumni
Ottoman Military College alumni
Committee of Union and Progress politicians
Ottoman military personnel of the Balkan Wars
Ottoman Army generals
Pashas
Ottoman military personnel of World War I
Ottoman governors of Damascus
1922 murders in Asia
People sentenced to death in absentia
Assassinated people from the Ottoman Empire
People from the Ottoman Empire murdered abroad
People murdered in Georgia (country)
Deaths by firearm in Georgia (country)
Recipients of the Pour le Mérite (military class)
People convicted by the Ottoman Special Military Tribunal
Ottoman governors of Baghdad
Baghdad vilayet
People assassinated by Operation Nemesis
Arab Revolt
Turks from the Ottoman Empire
Greek genocide perpetrators